Helmut Kohl (8 February 1943 – 26 September 1991) was an Austrian football referee and butcher best known for officiating three matches in the 1990 FIFA World Cup in Italy and also the 1990 European Cup Final. He died little over a year later at the age of 48.

Sources 
  Profile

1943 births
1991 deaths
Austrian football referees
FIFA World Cup referees
1990 FIFA World Cup referees
Butchers